Roy Santos Veneracion (born July 31, 1947 in Manila, Philippines) is a painter whose work explores a wide range of styles, techniques, materials, and subject matter. He is considered one of the leading abstract artists in his country and the precursor of contemporary Aesthetic Syncretism. His work is associated with the Syncretism Art Movement in the Philippines and abroad.

Early Years
The Philippines was granted full independence by the United States on July 4, 1946, and in the neo-liberated atmosphere of Manila, Roy Veneracion became aware of his growing passion for Art. He attended elementary school at the Espiritu Santo Parochial School in Sta. Cruz Manila, a Catholic school run by Belgian nuns, where Roy earned early recognition for his artistic skills. Roy has no memory of drawing in the manner of children of his age. He was readily recognized as an art prodigy and became a sort of Artist-in-Residence in his grade school years, tasked to decorate the blackboard on special occasions and create the biological and anatomical illustrations for his Science Classes and draw the maps for the Geography Subjects. But for Roy, this early recognition of his drawing skills was no "big deal" –for he dreamt of higher artistic accomplishments later on.

As he walked home from school in the bustling street of his neighborhood, when he was about eight years of age, he would often stop by a painter's shop to learn from the painter of movie billboards whose studio opened directly to the street. The quick dashes of brush strokes by the painter that deftly captured in large scale, portraits of movie stars, the heroes and heroines of popular comics-book novels impressed the young artist. But his more important influence and early mentor was his maternal uncle who recognized his talent and informally coached him and his older brother with tips on anatomy, proportion, chiaroscuro, linear perspective , and animal drawing. This uncle, an Army Captain, Bienvenido Santos, who fought in the underground resistance war against the Japanese as a guerrillero, was a former student of the famous Fernando Amorsolo and the neo-Classicist Guillermo Tolentino, but his artistic ambitions were derailed by World War II and superseded by a career as an Army Officer. As Roy's proficiency in classical art advanced, his uncle gifted him an Art book on figure drawing, an oil paintbox, and a boxed set of pastel colors, a deeply received gesture of encouragement for Roy Veneracion.

As a second-year high school student at the Colegio de San Juan de Letran, in Intramuros, Roy was awarded the first Prize in a student's Art Contest for a satirical ink drawing he did on the subject of professor and student's classroom interactions as his entry to the contest. In his third year, Roy was commissioned by his older brother's class to make a series of full-body watercolor illustrations of all the characters in Jose Rizal's great novels: the Noli Me Tangere and El Filibusterismo. He received 35 pesos for each drawing done on separate sheets of Oslo paper and the works were displayed along the corridors of the U.E. Classrooms where he attended his senior years in High School.

Family 
Roy's father, Geronimo Veneracion II, was a lawyer, a summa cum laude graduate who topped the National Bar Exams and received a Doctorate of Laws Degree from the Universidad Central de Madrid during the reign of Generalisimo Francisco Franco. Roy distinctly remembers a framed photograph of Franco shaking hands with his father in a ceremony honoring the occasion. His mother, Aida Santos, was the daughter of Mayor Dominador Santos of the town of Bocaue in Bulacan, and Pacita Flaviano Santos. His paternal grandparents were school masters: Geronimo Veneracion was the head teacher and Antonia Ongtengco, was the principal of the local school. They owned and managed farmlands in San Rafael, Bulacan, acquired from their savings as schoolteachers, and subsequently were also rice traders- an occupation that helped them survive the hardships of the Japanese Occupation during the Second World War. Roy was the second eldest son in a brood of four children. His siblings are Geronimo III, Leticia, and Reynaldo. He married Susan del Mar Lopez, a schoolmate in Art School and they have three children: Rachel, Ian, and Mikhail. The children are all successful professionals and Ian is a famous Movie and Television Star.

Art and life 
Art is intertwined with life, and as fate would have it, Roy pursued a Bachelor of Fine Arts Degree in college. He took the College Entrance Exams at the University of Santo Tomas and the University of the Philippines and passed both tests but chose to enroll in the U.P. College of Fine Arts because of its perceived more liberal atmosphere. He became an instant "darling" of his Fine Arts professors because of his well-honed skills in all the classical media: painting "still life" in oil or watercolor, drawing from the classical sculpture replicas, and the Oblation statue by Guillermo Tolentino, sketching, and painting from live models was all a breeze. He did all those things in multiple styles, and media and earned for him straight 1 and 1.5 grades in all his submitted plates. His outstanding productions led his first-year professor Prof. Flor Agbayani, in Painting I & II to tell him that there is nothing more that he can be taught in her class and that he should set out to experiment on his own provided he submitted his canvases on time.

But to assuage his worrisome parents regarding his financial future as an artist, Roy majored in Advertising instead of Painting. Again, he was awarded the First Prize for his illustrations for his Editorial Design thesis. At this point, he neglected the opportunities of joining other art competitions to garner more awards and further cement his artistic reputation in the Manila Art Scene. Instead, he became indulgently engaged in activities that his youthful non-artist friends were “into” that seemed exhilaratingly novel although artistically non-productive. But to be an artist, one has first to live life.

1970- Roy married Susan Lopez, a fashion model and Beauty Contest (Binibining Filipinas) finalist, and they soon had their first child, Rachel. He found jobs in Advertising Agencies and worked in the Creative Department of PhilProm, when in 1972, Martial Law was declared by President Ferdinand Marcos. All news media outlets were closed, and although Roy was retained in the skeleton force of the ad agency while waiting for things to normalize, the future seemed bleak causing him to resign his post to seek an opportunity to launch his true calling as a serious artist. Roy introduced himself to the art world and soon got invited to join group exhibitions in a leading gallery: Galerie Bleue in Makati.

1974-1975- Spurred by a former U.P. classmate, N. Carating, Roy Veneracion joined an art contest sponsored by the newly founded Miladay Art Gallery in Makati. He did not win the contest, but his entry so impressed some art enthusiasts and art professionals that he was offered a One-Man-Show in the Gallery that same year. The show was followed by other shows in rapid successions wherein Roy became known as an enfant terrible Abstract Expressionist. His painting style consisted of pouring liquified oil paint onto puddles of water on prepared board panels laid flat on the floor which he tilted to make the mixture flow in various directions creating rainbows of colors that coalesce into unpredictable Surreal configurations. The medium and the technique suggested the direction to take with subsequent improvisational gestures that sometimes included: soil, pebbles, nails, twigs, and print markings of the artist's body. Roy Veneracion's art activities attracted the attention of like-minded artists, art dealers, and connoisseurs.

1976-1979 -Foreign travel was banned, but with an exhibition at the Philippine House in Mainz, Germany as a pretext, Roy Veneracion, N. Carating, and Eva Florentino were able to secure travel permits to Europe, Canada, and the USA. In London and Paris, exposure to the great art collections of the Tate and the Louvre, Montmartre, and Pegal districts broadened his artistic insight and gave him a sense of oneness with all the artists that had gone before, Roy and his friends also visited with ex-pat Filipino artists living and working in Paris, such as Ofie Gelvezon Tequi and Nena Saguil and talked about Parisian artistic life. Eva brought home a work by Nena Saguil, and the two artists exchanged works with Ofie Tequi. Tony Daroy, the painter who did ethnic-primitive flat patterned paintings, joined their group in Paris and together they took the Euro-Rail to Mainz, Germany.

In Toronto, Canada, Roy Veneracion and Lito Carating met and exchanged views with local artists and did some paintings, many of which, however, were destroyed when they met a near-fatal car accident on their way to Washington DC. The event jolted Roy to re-think his position: were they making this pilgrimage to these great art centers of the west motivated by a need to re-trace the footsteps of the historical Filipino art icons: Juan Luna and Felix Ressurecion Hidalgo, Edades, and the rest?

While in the US, Eva Florentino organized Art Exhibitions for the group in various alternative venues. Victor Oteyza, one of the original 13 Moderns, based in Washington DC, and Lamberto Hechanova, the sculptor, based in New York, joined the visiting young Filipino artists in a major exhibition at the Catholic University of America in Washington DC.

But things were also brewing in the art scene back home and his family was expecting his return, so after visiting his mother and brother in L.A., Roy headed back home.

1980–1985 - Martial Law lingered on and Art was a struggle for everyone. Roy was made Artist-In-Residence of the Cultural Center of the Philippines for two consecutive years and regularly joined the CCP Annual Exhibitions organized by Museum Director Raymundo Albano. He became friends with Jose Joya, a former mentor and foremost Abstract Expressionist in the country, exhibiting with him along with a group of young abstractionists in Manila and San Francisco, USA. While showing his experimental abstracts with the group, Roy was also in the midst of developing his own style of merging differentiated art principles with his abstraction, allowing him to do works that protested the festering dictatorial regime and commented on the escalating arms race between the USSR and the NATO Allies.

1986- The Marcos Dictatorship was dismantled by a popular uprising known to the World as the peaceful People Power Revolution. Roy Veneracion made a momentous painting chronicling the events on canvas with symbolical imagery, as he ran to-and-from his studio home and took part in the EDSA Revolution with his wife, Susan, their children: Rachel, and Ian (the child TV star), and artist friend Lito Carating.

1990- Roy Veneracion received the Cultural Center of the Philippines' 13 Artists Award. He also formed the artists’ group that called itself "The Remedios Circle" a pun name suggested by Rock Drilon, because they met invariably at the Penguin Cafe and Gallery at the Remedios Circle in Malate, discussing Art and planning exhibitions. The group's exhibiting members included: Mars Galang, Lao Lianben, Gus Albor, Cesare & Jean Marie Syjuco, Lito Carating, Rock Drilon, Hermisanto, Jojo Legaspi, Antonio Ramboyong, Pablo Orendain, Ian Veneracion, among others, who more-or-less regularly hung out with the group. The Penguin Cafe & Gallery became the "In" place as an artists’ hang-out during that time.

2005- Veneracion launched his Syncretism Aesthetics with a show titled: SYNCRETISM & BEYOND at the Mag:net+ Gallery, in Makati—a gallery specializing in Avant-Garde Art operated by his artist friend Rock Drilon. With some friends arguing that syncretism cannot be done, Roy persevered with his idea and won the support of critics in the Academe such as Dr. Reuben Ramas Cañete of U.P. and re-enforced by the acquisition by the Philippine National Museum, for its permanent collection, of one of Roy's Syncretistic Anti-Dictatorship works titled: IKA-13 PANGITAIN NI JUAN.

2006–2016 - Roy continues to explore new possibilities and techniques in painting and remains active in exhibitions in Manila and abroad.

Philosophy and style 
The cobbling and suturing together of different or opposing elements, both old and new, conventional and radical, and positive and negative, into a resulting artwork that advocates an expanding and expansive goal has a fourfold aim, according to “The Syncretism Manifesto” also written by Roy. These aims include: “the rejection of dogmatism, fundamentalism, traditionalism, and exclusivity: the denunciation, repudiation, refusal, elimination, and discarding of charlatans posing as artists and art lovers who twist public opinion into believing that marketability equals artistic excellence; debunking the singular, signature style as a means of mass production and easy product recall; and the cultivation of multiple styles, multiple techniques, multi-media, multiple personalities and guises, in order not to be pigeon-holed and trapped in little boxes to be rarefied, classified, or commodified. For this to be achieved, the movement subscribes to the “embrace of all denominations, factions, cliques, trans-genders and breeders, the establishment, the heretics, the marginalized, the ostracized, the fat, the thin, Capitalists and Communists:” and “the assimilation of Americanism, Europeanism, Chinafication, Japanization, Latinification, Filipinization, Art Brut, Naif, Dada, Fluxus, Subliminal-Automatism-Abstract, Pop, Anti-Art, Baroque, and grandma Art.”

This combination of the catholicity of taste as well as a pan-inclusivity of viewpoints and perspectives - except those which reject outright the Syncretist values of intellectual openness and freedom, as well as the very explicit prohibition against artistic falsehood and the surrender to the commodity market, originates from very distinct historical roots: the liberal atmosphere of the late Sixties era U.P. Diliman, with its contradictions of bureaucratic orthodoxy intermingled with faculty and student radicalism and the cornucopia of disparate aesthetic thoughts percolating within the Fine Arts studios. This included Bobby Chabet's anti-commercialist Conceptualism; Jose Joya's embrace of both Abstract painting and Figurative Drawing; Virginia Flor-Agbayani's romantic Modernism; Rod Paras-Perez's formalism and the great western tradition; and Billy Abueva's native figuration circumscribed either in modernist brutalism or a curvaceous sensuality. Of these mentors, Joya was the closest to Roy's felt advocacies and crystallized for him the fluid possibilities of fusing and rejoining what the western mind has sundered apart in the name of hegemonic imperialism and homogenous modernity. This was expanded by Roy's journeys in Japan, Europe, and the U.S. to witness the works firsthand of the major innovators of the period from the Seventies to the Eighties: Robert Rauschenberg, Andy Warhol, Sigmar Polke, Eric Fischl, and David Salle. This outward journey also expanded his horizons by not simply limiting the visual experience to the great museums (the Louvre, the Tate, MoMA, the Met, the Guggenheim, Fukuoka) but also to the peripherialized areas of modern (read ethnic) artistic production, such as studios of American-Indians, Asian-Americans, Canadians and graffiti artists in Los Angeles and New York. Reflecting on his work, and applying it to his own historical and cultural context in the Philippines since the mid-Eighties, Roy laid the foundations of his Syncretism principle through this globalized synthesis and cobbling together of various artistic principles, introducing as his own suturing strategy the local context of lived experience, historical trauma, and contemporary portents of future catastrophe. Flash forward to 2010. With the success of his 2008 Syncretism exhibition at LA Art Core in Los Angeles behind him, Roy once more revisits the territory of opposing ideas that have led him down a twenty-year path of differential art making, this time into twin forms of multi-paneled paintings which he calls "Cluster paintings"; and scroll-type "tapestry paintings", both of which subvert the traditional dichotomies of western and eastern painting approaches in distinct ways. The cluster paintings expand the visual scope beyond the strict boundaries of a single frame, allowing multiple paintings to cohere visually by "accretion", or the assemblage of differently-sized quadrilateral canvases beyond a central core, exploding the monolithic nature of "square framing". The tapestry paintings do away with the restrictive box frame itself, floating over the wall with its Asian-style scroll hanger, becoming one with the elements of wind and earth. Thus, both formats transgress accepted boundaries or restrictions to art: the first being rooted in the tradition of singular masterpieces; the second as a silent commentary on the domination of one culture over another.

Their inscribed aesthetic patterns (their 'painted-ness and its "content", so to speak) are a by-now distinct blend of abstract washes and gestural strokes, and figurative re-renderings in paint of stock images from photography and pop culture. On the one hand, they coexist on the picture plane formally, either as "ground-figure relationships" (such as can be found in "Three Graces" and "Independence Day-So What Have We Done") or as key blocked elements that subdivide the composition into zones of abstract-figure contrasts (as can be found in "What About Our Children" or "Antique Store Cards Create Nostalgia"). At another level, they also play at the subtle social and cultural differences between depicted subjects within a general figure-ground composition. "Maria Clara and the Natives", "The Musicians" or "Perseus and the Igorots" explore this more nuanced narration of social and cultural disjuncture, where the oppressive impact of western colonization and imperialism in the Philippine experience is both felt and resisted both by the colonized as well as the colonial, resulting into parodies of conflicting images immersed in acid baths of Modernist color-fields. At still another level, the evocation of lost nature and imperiling globality makes itself felt in works like "Holy Macaque" or "Heir to the Ages", with its air of environmental catastrophe looming over the horizon, a disaster traceable to the unsustainable industrial consumerism that global capitalism has unleashed upon late modern life and material relations.

The last motif, which Roy also focused on in his 2008 "Syncretism" series, is also joined by "abstract works" (abstract in the sense that they utilize Non-Objectivist visualities in painting) that combine both fluid color-washes (of the style associated with Louis Morris) with thick, nervously-drawn gestural strokes with thick textures (like Sam Frances as loosened up by graffiti art) but combined in a visual montage of bright colors and sensual forms verging on an erotic descriptive intermingled with the materiality of daily life. This is then re-read into the artist's vision of nature and human experience, becoming palimpsests wherein we (as him) occupy surrealist-like dreams of wonder and regret ("Catching Clouds in Polychrome", "Seen and Unseen", and "Dawn Dispersed the Night"), narrate ironic metacommentaries of elitist consumerism ("Corporate Chic" or "Subliminal Abstract"), or a poetic return from civilizational (because patriarchal) hypocrisy towards a non-judgmental Nature that is motherly and nurturing ("Fragile Blue Sky"). The key to understanding these double-coded works is Roy's invocation of "pareidolia", or the human psyche's ability to recognize patterns from otherwise random forms. Also, the Latin 'alucinari' is flagged, as in the hallucinatory effect of dreams, mirages, and coded symbols that may mean nothing and everything at the same time.

The role of the artist as conceptualizer of ideas coupled with the revolutionary nature of the avant-garde practitioner who sees the virtues of both the ideal and the unified thus indentures the forms that Roy Veneracion deploys in the reiteration of aesthetic integration - a melange of sorts - produced through this polyvalence of approaches and perspectives. Analyzing his own position in the painting titled The Painter, Roy summarizes Syncretism as an omnivore's passion for the textural integrity of disparate elements in (philosophical) diets and (kinesthetic) desires, one that simultaneously expands away from the limitations of rote traditionalism to encompass a world of gestures and ideas, summoning in their unitary resuturing another world that is ideal, whole, and free.

Exhibitions 
One Man Shows

2016 FINDING WITHOUT SEEKING, Altromondo Arte Contemporaneo, Greenbelt 5, Makati

2013 ROY VENERACION - SYNCRE ART. NCCA GALLERY, NCCA Bldg., General Luna Street, Intramuros, Manila.

2011 THE ESSENTIALITY OF POLYSTYLE SYNCRETISM TO A MULTIPLE PERSONALITY ARTIST IN THE 21ST CENTURY - NOVA GALLERY warehouse 12A La Fuerza Compound, Don Chino Roces Ave. Makati

2009 SYNCRETISM - ROY VENERACION; Jack Miller & Associates Gallery, La Cienega Blvd., L.A. Ca., USA

2008 SYNCRETISM - ROY VENERACION; Union Center for the Arts., L. A. Artcore, Judge John Aiso Blvd., L.A. Ca., USA

2005 SYNCRETISM & BEYOND; Mag:net+Gallery, Paseo de Roxas, Makati

2004 CHAKRAS - The Region of Power; West Gallery, Glorietta, Makati

2002 Galleria Duemila, Artwalk, S.M. Megamall, Mandaluyong

2002 Mag:net+The Loop, ELJ Center Bldg., ABS-CBN Compound, Quezon City

2000 SUPERIMPOSE West Gallery, Glorietta, Makati

1995 Solar Drive, Hollywood Hills, L.A. Ca. USA

1994 TO YOUR UNCONSCIOUS; Galleria Duemila, Artwalk, SM Megamall, Mandaluyong

1991 RANDOM EXPLORATIONS; Brix Gallery, Makati

1991 PAINTED OBJECTS; Alliance Francaise, Makati

1989 MURAL PROJECT; "Ito na nga ang Paraiso ni Juan Tranquilino" Bulwagang Carlos V. Francisco, CCP, Manila

1987 LUZVIMINDA, Finale Art File, Makati, MM

1986 SKITZO; Penguin Cafe and Gallery, Malate, Manila

1983 CCP Small Gallery, CCP, Manila

1982 FIFTH ONE-MAN-SHOW, Gallerie Bleue, Rustan's, Makti, MM

1981 Hiraya Gallery, U.N. Avenue, Ermita, Manila

1975 Philippine Art Center, Quad, Makati, Rizal

1974 1st ONE-MAN-SHOW; Miladay Art Center, Quad, Makati

Group exhibitions

2016 ABSTRACT ART, FINALE ART FILE, Pasong Tamo, Makati

2014 SAMPO’T ISANG DALIRI Galeria Astra, Makati

2012 MANILART, XMX Center, Pasay

2009 KWATRO KANTOS, Sining Kamalig, Gateway, Cubao, Quezon City

2008 JACK MILLER & ASSOCIATES GALLERY La Cienega Blvd, L.A. Ca. USA

2007 PEERS ENSEMBLE, Pinto Gallery, Antipolo City

2006 3 MAN-SHOW - Roy, Ian & Mikhail, Mag:net+Gallery, The Loop, ELJ Center, ABS-CBN, Quezon City

2004 FORUM FOR FOUR, Art Forum, Caimhill Road., Singapore City

2002 17th ASIAN INTERNATIONAL ART EXHIBITION, Daejeon Municipal Museum, Daejeon, Korea

2001 HECK FINAL, City Gallery, Los Feliz Blvd. Ca. USA

2000 TRANSMODERN TRANSGRESSIONS 3 Artists Show - Roy, Ian, and Chati, Bulwagang Fernando Amorsolo, CCP, Manila

1999 THE 14th ASIAN INTERNATIONAL ART EXHIBITION, Fukuoka Asian Art Museum, Fukuoka, Japan

1999 LABINTATLO, CCP Main Gallery, CCP, Manila

1998 EROS, Crucible Gallery, Artwalk, SM Megamall, Mandaluyong

1997 MODERN ART, Art Center, Megamall, Mandaluyong

1996 UNBOUNDED, Australian Center, Makati

1992 ASIAN INTERNATIONAL ART EXHIBITION, Indonesia

1991 DANGEROUS BUT ORDAINED, University of the Philippine, Quezon City

1990 CCP GAWAD PARA SA SINING BISWAL, 13 ARTISTS AWARDS, CCP Main Gallery, CCP, Manila

1989 SEGUNDA BIENAL DELA HAVANA, Wifredo Lam Center, Havana, Cuba

1988 2nd ASIA-PACIFIC ARTS FESTIVAL, Club Med, Cherating, Malaysia

1986 BAGKUS-BUGKUS (BECAUSE WE'RE TOGETHER), Metropolitan Museum of Manila

1986 PIGLAS (BREAK FREE), CCP Main Gallery, CCP, Manila

1985 2nd ASIAN ART FESTIVAL, Fukuoka Museum, Fukuoka, Japan

1984 A ROADSHOW EXHIBITION, People's Republic of China

1983 SITEWORKS II, U.P. Los Banos, Laguna

1981 ASEAN TRAVELING EXHIBITION, ASEAN Nations

1980-1988 CCP ANNUAL EXHIBITIONS FOR THE VISUAL ARTS, CCP, Manila

1980 SEVEN FILIPINO ARTISTS, Philippine House, San Francisco, USA

1979 MUSEUM ARTISTS, 1979, MOPA, Manila

1978 SEPIA WORKSHOP, Soho, New York City, USA

1978 INSIGHTS INTO PHILIPPINE CONTEMPORARY ART, IMF Building, Washington D.C., USA

1977 CANADIAN NATIONAL EXPOSITION, Toronto, Ontario, Canada

1977 Amerasian Center, Washington, D.C. USA

1976 Mullen Hall, Catholic University of America, Washington, D.C. USA

1976 FOUR FILIPINO ARTISTS, Oxon County Library, Alexandria, Virginia, USA

1976 FIVE FILIPINO ARTISTS, Philippine House Mainz, Germany

1976 KONTIKI, Kowloon, Hong Kong

1973 MINI-MAXI EXHIBITION, Gallerie Bleue, Rustan's, Makati

AWARDS & DISTINCTIONS:

1990 Cultural Center of the Philippines Gawad CCP Para sa Sining Biswal or 13 Artists Awards

1982 Art Association of the Philippines Recognition of Excellence in the Arts Award

1968 1st Prize Award- College Thesis, Editorial Design, U.P. College of Fine Arts

1960 1st Prize- Student's Art Contest, San Juan de Letran College, Intramuros, Manila

RESIDENCIES:

1983-1984 Cultural center of the Philippines Artist in Residence - Conducted Creative Workshops for the Arts

GRANTS:

1989 CCP Mural Project 6, Bulwagang Carlos V. Francisco

1990 CCP 13 Artists Awards Exhibition

References

Sources
1. ART AND ITS CONTEXT, essays, reviews, and interviews on Philippine Art-Reuben Ramas Canete, University of Santo Tomas Publishing House, c. 2012.

2. THE NATIONAL MUSEUM VISUAL ARTS COLLECTION published by National Museum of the Philippines Executive House, Padre, Manila, c. 1991.

3. ART PHILIPPINES, The Crucible Workshop, c.  1992.>

4. National Commission for Culture and Arts Gallery presents: Roy Veneracion-SYNCRE ART 2013, www.ncca.gov.ph

5. UNEXPLORED TERRAIN, Hannah Jo Uy and Pinggot Zulueta, MANILA BULLETIN, May 2, 2016.

6. FINDING WITHOUT SEEKING, Reuben Ramas Canete Phd, THE PHILIPPINE STAR, May 2, 2016.

7. ROY VENERACION OPENS UP TO THE WORLD, Cid Reyes, PHILIPPINE DAILY INQUIRER, May 23, 2016

8. interview with the artist

1947 births
Living people
Filipino painters
University of the Philippines Diliman alumni
People from Manila